Sungai Abong is a main suburb in Muar District, Johor, Malaysia. But it was renamed Simpang Jeram since the 2018 general election.

Schools
 SJK(C) Soon Cheng

References

Townships in Johor
Towns, suburbs and villages in Muar
Muar District